Calamotropha fulvifusalis is a moth in the family Crambidae. It was described by George Hampson in 1900. It is found in Amur and Ussuri in the Russian Far East and Honshu and Hokkaido in Japan.

References

Crambinae
Moths described in 1900